Mario Enrique Lepe González (born 25 March 1965) is a retired Chilean footballer. He spent his entire career with Universidad Católica. He also represented the Chilean national side.

On 19 April 2012, Lepe was fired as coach after Universidad Católica failed to advance to the next stage of the Copa Libertadores.

See also
List of one-club men

References

External links

1965 births
Living people
Chilean footballers
Chile international footballers
1993 Copa América players
Club Deportivo Universidad Católica footballers
Club Deportivo Universidad Católica managers
Association football midfielders
Chilean football managers